Department of Financial Services may refer to:

 New York State Department of Financial Services (DFS or NYSDFS), responsible for regulating financial services and products
 Florida Department of Financial Services (FLDFS), a state agency of Florida
 Department of Financial Services, of the Ministry of Finance (India)

See also
 Michigan Department of Insurance and Financial Services (DIFS)
 DFS (disambiguation)